Dicyphini is a tribe of bugs in the family Miridae.

Subtribes and Genera
The On-line Systematic Catalogue of Plant Bugs includes:

Subtribe Dicyphina

 Campyloneura Fieber, 1861
 Campyloneuropsis Poppius, 1914
 Chius
 Cychrocapsus
 Cyrtopeltis Fieber, 1861
 Dicyphus Fieber, 1858
 Engytatus Reuter, 1875
 Haematocapsus
 Isoproba
 Macrolophus Fieber, 1858
 Microoculis
 Muirmiris
 Nesidiocoris Kirkaldy, 1902
 Pameridea Reuter, 1907
 Setocoris
 Singhalesia China & Carvalho, 1952
 Tupiocoris China & Carvalho, 1952
 Usingerella China & Carvalho, 1952

Subtribe Monaloniina

 Arculanus
 Arthriticus
 Dimia
 Eucerocoris
 Eupachypeltis
 Felisacoris
 Felisacus
 Helopeltis Signoret, 1858
 Mansoniella
 †Miomonalonion
 Monalonion Herrich-Schäffer, 1850
 Onconotellus
 Pachypeltis (insect) Signoret, 1858
 Pachypeltopsis
 Parapachypeltis
 Pararculanus
 Physophoroptera
 Physophoropterella
 Poppiusia
 Ragwelellus
 Rayieria
 Schuhirandella

Subtribe Odoniellina

 Boxia
 Boxiopsis
 Bryocoropsis
 Chamopsis
 Chamus Distant, 1904
 Distantiella China, 1944
 Lycidocoris
 Mircarvalhoia
 Odoniella Haglund, 1895
 Pantilioforma
 Parachamus
 Platyngomiriodes
 Platyngomiris
 Pseudodoniella
 Rhopaliceschatus
 Sahlbergella Haglund, 1895
 Villiersicoris
 Volkeliopsis
 Volkelius
 Yangambia

References

External links
 
 BioLib.cz: tribus Dicyphini Reuter, 1883

 
Bryocorinae
Hemiptera tribes